Mud Will Be Flung Tonight! is an album by the American singer and comedian Bette Midler. It is a live recording of one of Midler's stand-up comedy shows performed in 1985. Although primarily a spoken word album, Midler is accompanied onstage by her long-time musical collaborator Marc Shaiman on piano. The album captures Midler "throwing mud into the faces of some of your favorites", among them Madonna ("Like a virgin.....? Touched for the very first time....? For the very first time today!") Meryl Streep, Bruce Springsteen and Olivia Newton-John ("Let's get physical... let me hear your body talk..... My body said "Fuck you!!!") and it also includes the original version of the song "Otto Titsling", three years later re-recorded in the studio and prominently featured in the movie Beaches.

The album was released on CD for the first time in 1989. Unlike the rest of Midler's discography up to this point, this album was never reissued on CD and is currently out of print.

Track listing

Side A
 "Taking Aim" (Bette Midler) - 5:09
 "Fit Or Fat 'Fat As I Am'" (Bette Midler, Jerry Blatt, Marc Shaiman) - 3:10
 "Marriage, Movies, Madonna and Mick" (Bette Midler) - 6:39
 "Vickie Eydie" / "I'm Singing Broadway" (Bette Midler, Jerry Blatt) - 4:44

Side B
 "Coping" (Bette Midler) - 1:40
 "The Unfettered Boob" (Bette Midler) - 2:58
 "Otto Titsling" (Bette Midler, Jerry Blatt, Charlene Seeger) - 4:20
 "Why Bother?" (Bette Midler) - 6:44
 "Soph" (Bette Midler) - 4:32

Personnel
 Bette Midler - vocals
 Marc Shaiman - piano

Production
 Bette Midler - record producer, writer
 Bob Kaminsky -  record producer
 Jerry Blatt - record producer
 Additional material by: Jerry Blatt, Frank Mula, Lenny Ripps, Marc Shaiman, Charlene Seeger, Bruce Vilanch
 Marc Shaiman - musical arranger
 Bonnie Bruckheimer-Martell - associate producer
 Recorded at Budd Friedman's Improvisation, Los Angeles, California, April 30 - May 1, 1985
 Recorded by Guy Charboneau & Cliff Bonnell, Le Mobile
 Mixed and edited by John Alberts at Regent Sound Studio
 Second engineer: Mark Partis
 Assistant engineer: Ralph Kelsey

Bette Midler live albums
1985 live albums
Atlantic Records live albums
Live comedy albums
1980s comedy albums
Stand-up comedy albums